Gulzarwala is a village of Dera Ghazi Khan District in the Punjab province of Pakistan. It is located at 30°20'50N 70°39'45E lying to the north of the district capital Dera Ghazi Khan - with an altitude of 126 metres (416 feet).

References

Populated places in Dera Ghazi Khan District
Villages in Dera Ghazi Khan District